Genotyping is the process of determining differences in the genetic make-up (genotype) of an individual by examining the individual's DNA sequence using biological assays and comparing it to another individual's sequence or a reference sequence. It reveals the alleles an individual has inherited from their parents. Traditionally genotyping is the use of DNA sequences to define biological populations by use of molecular tools. It does not usually involve defining the genes of an individual.

Techniques 
Current methods of genotyping include  restriction fragment length polymorphism identification (RFLPI) of genomic DNA, random amplified polymorphic detection (RAPD) of genomic DNA, amplified fragment length polymorphism detection (AFLPD), polymerase chain reaction (PCR), DNA sequencing, allele specific oligonucleotide (ASO) probes, and hybridization to DNA microarrays or beads.  Genotyping is important in research  of genes and gene variants associated with disease.  Due to current technological limitations, almost all genotyping is partial.  That is, only a small fraction of an individual’s genotype is determined, such as with (epi)GBS (Genotyping by sequencing) or RADseq.  New  mass-sequencing technologies promise to provide whole-genome genotyping (or whole genome sequencing) in the future.

Applications 
Genotyping applies to a broad range of individuals, including microorganisms. For example, viruses and bacteria can be genotyped.  Genotyping in this context may help in controlling the spreading of pathogens, by tracing the origin of outbreaks. This area is often referred to as molecular epidemiology or forensic microbiology.

Human genotyping 
Humans can also be genotyped.  For example, when testing fatherhood or motherhood, scientists typically only need to examine 10 or 20 genomic regions (like single-nucleotide polymorphism (SNPs)), which represent a tiny fraction of the human genome.

When genotyping transgenic organisms, a single genomic region may be all that needs to be examined to determine the genotype.  A single PCR assay is typically enough to genotype a transgenic mouse; the mouse is the mammalian model of choice for much of medical research today.

Ethical concerns 
The ethical concerns of genotyping humans have been a topic of discussion. The rise of genotyping technologies will make it possible to screen large populations of people for genetic diseases and predispositions for disease. The benefits of population wide genotyping have been contended by ethical concerns on consent and general benefit of wide span screening. Genotyping identifies mutations that increase susceptibility of a person to develop a disease, but disease development is not guaranteed in most cases, which can cause psychological damage. Discrimination can arise from various genetic markers identified by genotyping, such as athletic advantages or disadvantages in professional sports or risk of disease development later in life. Much of the ethical concerns surrounding genotyping arise from information availability, as in who can access the genotype of an individual in various contexts.

Tuberculosis 
Genotyping is used in the medical field to identify and control the spread of tuberculosis (TB). Originally, genotyping was only used to confirm outbreaks of tuberculosis; but with the evolution of genotyping technology it is now able to do far more. Advances in genotyping technology led to the realization that many cases of tuberculosis, including infected individuals living in the same household, were not actually linked. This caused the formation of universal genotyping in an attempt to understand transmission dynamics. Universal genotyping revealed complex transmission dynamics based on things like socio-epidemiological factors. This led to the use of polymerase chain reactions (PCR) which allowed for faster detection of tuberculosis. This rapid detection method is used to prevent TB. The addition of whole genome sequencing (WGS) allowed for identification of strains of TB which could then be put in a chronological cluster map. These cluster maps show the origin of cases and the time in which those cases arose. This gives a much clearer picture of transmission dynamics and allows for better control and prevention of transmission. All of these different forms of genotyping are used together to detect TB, prevent its spread and trace the origin of infections. This has helped to reduce the number of TB cases.

Agricultural Usage 
Many types of genotyping are used in agriculture. One type that is used is genotyping by sequencing because it aids agriculture with crop breeding. For this purpose, single nucleotide polymorphisms (SNPs) are used as markers and RNA sequencing is used to look at gene expression in crops. The knowledge gained from this type of genotyping allows for selective breeding of crops in ways which benefit agriculture. In the case of alfalfa, the cell wall was improved through selective breeding that was made possible by this type of genotyping. These techniques have also resulted in the discovery of genes that provide resistance to diseases. A gene called Yr15 was discovered in wheat, which protects against a disease called yellow wheat rust. Selective breeding for the Yr15 gene then prevented yellow wheat rust, benefiting agriculture.

See also

References

External links
International HapMap Project 
resources for genotyping microorganisms

Genetics techniques